WENC (1220 AM) is a radio station licensed to Whiteville, North Carolina, United States. The station is currently owned by Godwin Communications, LLC.

References

External links

ENC